The Dixidae (meniscus midges) are a family of aquatic nematoceran flies (Diptera). The larvae live in unpolluted, standing fresh waters, just beneath the surface film, usually amongst marginal aquatic vegetation. They are found in all continents except Antarctica.

Description
For terms see Morphology of Diptera

Dixidae are small (body length not more than 5.0 mm) slender gnats with thin legs. The head is relatively broad. The antennae are thin and the flagellum has 14 segments. The proboscis is short and thick and the palpi are five-segmented. The thorax is slightly convex. The wing veins are without scales (with scales in the closely related family Culicidae. The subcosta is fused with the costa at the level of the base of Rs or slightly proximal to this. The wing venation exhibits radial, medial, and cubital forks (R 4 branched, M 2 branched, Cu 2 branched).  R 2+ 3 is strongly arched, the r–m crossvein is distinct, and the discal cell is absent. The anal vein of the wing is long. The genitalia of the male is inverted at 180° by torsion of segments 5–8.

Evolutionary history 
The oldest known fossils of the group come from the Jurassic of Asia, assigned to the extinct genera Syndixa and Eucorethrina, members of modern genera are not known until the Eocene.

References

Further reading
Lindner , E 193 1. Dixinae (Culicidae) 3, 11-12, 1-43 In: Lindner, E. (Ed.). Die Fliegen der Paläarktischen Region Keys to Palaearctic species but now needs revision (in German).
A. A. Shtakel'berg Family Dixidae in  Bei-Bienko, G. Ya, 1988 Keys to the insects of the European Part of the USSR Volume 5 (Diptera) Part 2 English edition.Keys to Palaearctic species but now needs revision .

External links
Delta Int Key family description and image
BugGuide
Wing venation
EOL images
Diptera.info images
Dixiidae in Italian

 
Nematocera families